The 2021 Southwestern Athletic Conference baseball tournament was held at Toyota Field in Madison, Alabama from May 19 through 23.  Southern won the Tournament for the 17th time and earned the conference's automatic bid to the 2021 NCAA Division I baseball tournament.

The double elimination tournament featured four teams from each division.

Seeding and format
The four eligible teams in each division weree seeded one through four, with the top seed from each division facing the fourth seed from the opposite division in the first round, and so on.  The teams then played a two bracket, double-elimination tournament with a one-game final between the winners of each bracket.

Tournament

Bracket

Game results

All-Tournament Team
The following players were named to the All-Tournament Team.

Most Valuable Player
O’Neill Burgos was named Tournament Most Valuable Player.  Burgos was a designated hitter for Southern.

References

Tournament
Southwestern Athletic Conference Baseball Tournament
Southwestern Athletic Conference baseball tournament
Southwestern Athletic Conference baseball tournament